Lazarenko is a surname, and may refer to:

Angelina Lazarenko (born 1998), Russian volleyball player
Bohdan Lazarenko (born 1995), Ukrainian footballer
Cliff Lazarenko (born 1952), English darts player
Ivan Lazarenko (disambiguation)
Lana Lazarenko, alternative name for comic book character Lana Lang
Olga Lazarenko (born 1980), Russian skier
Pavlo Lazarenko (born 1953), Prime Minister of Ukraine
Viktor Lazarenko (born 1957), Soviet/Ukrainian footballer
Viktoriia Lazarenko (born 2003), Russian skier
Vitaly Lazarenko (1890–1939), Russian/Soviet acrobat

Ukrainian-language surnames